Mary Melissa Hoadley Dodge (August 21, 1861 – December 24, 1934) was an American heiress who moved to England and sponsored many causes during her life, including women's suffrage, theosophy and the arts.

Move to London
She was the daughter of Sarah Tappan Hoadley (August 16, 1832–January 10, 1909) and William Earl Dodge, Jr. (1832–1903) from New York. The family wealth came from a mercantile business that developed into one of the largest copper mining and copper wire manufacturing companies in America called Phelps, Dodge & Co. Mary was one of six children and she, like her sister Grace Hoadley Dodge (1856–1914), remained unmarried and lived with her parents for several years. To seek some independence, Mary moved to London, England. Her father supported her decision, and purchased a house for her in Brompton Square, where she lived with a female companion from New York named Julia Fairchild Schreiner (1864–1953).

Dodge moved from Brompton Square to the more fashionable Eaton Square, and then to Warwick House in the precincts of St James's Palace. She also had a residence named West Side House, located on West Side, Wimbledon Common, in south-west London. She was well-connected in London society, and corresponded with authors, artists and others including Lord Baden-Powell, Henry James and John Singer Sargent. She took pleasure in spending her money on friends, and once took seven guests to the Baltic Sea on board a hired yacht. One of the party, architect Sir Edwin Landseer Lutyens (1869–1944), wrote of the experience: 
 He also remarked that she seemed to tire easily, and that this was the result of an arthritic condition.

Another example of her generosity was when she hired His Majesty's Theatre and paid all production costs for six performances of an opera titled The Wreckers by another friend, composer and author Dame Ethel Smyth (1858-1944).

Theosophy
Dodge gained a new companion at Warwick House, Muriel, Countess De La Warr (1872-1930), daughter of Lord Brassey, who had divorced her husband Gilbert Sackville, 8th Earl De La Warr in 1902. Lady Emily Lutyens (1874-1964), architect Edwin Lutyens' wife and daughter of Robert Bulwer-Lytton, 1st Earl of Lytton, introduced Mary and Muriel to theosophy and to the works of Annie Besant (1847-1933). 

Dodge provided financial support for the Theosophical Society and for the construction of its London headquarters (designed by Edwin Lutyens) in Tavistock Square. The building is now BMA House, the headquarters of the British Medical Association. 

On May 5, 1911 Besant arrived in London from India with Jiddu Krishnamurti (1895-1986) – identified as their future spiritual leader – and his brother Nitya (1898-1925). When in England during the period 1911-1919, the Krishnamurti brothers lodged in quite a few different places, including with Mary Dodge at West Side House, and in lodgings provided by Muriel De La Warr in 2 different locations: sometimes Old Lodge in Ashdown Forest, Sussex, and sometimes a flat at No. 2 Robert Street, Adelphi, London. 

In 1913, Dodge settled £500 per year for life on Jiddu, and £300 per year on Jiddu's brother, Nitya, during the years Nitya was a student at Oxford University.

Suffrage
Dodge and De La Warr also supported the Suffragette movement and became involved with Sir Francis Meynell. They helped him and George Lansbury purchase the Daily Herald, a bankrupt Labour newspaper. It was relaunched as a socialist daily newspaper and supported the militant suffrage campaign. Later the two women helped Meynell create the Pelican Press.

Final Years
Despite her great wealth, Dodge was hit by the Depression years and had to cut back on her generosity. Her illness also confined her to a wheelchair in later years. She downsized in London and eventually moved to Wick Hall, Hove, on the south coast of England in about 1930, giving up her houses in London and Wimbledon. Esmond Harmsworth, 2nd Viscount Rothermere became the new owner of Warwick House in 1923. Mary Dodge died on Christmas Eve 1934, leaving about $3 million, mainly to family and friends.

Family

Notes

References

1861 births
1934 deaths
American emigrants to England
Dodge family